Conceptual may refer to:

Philosophy and Humanities
Concept
Conceptualism
Philosophical analysis (Conceptual analysis)
Theoretical definition (Conceptual definition)
Thinking about Consciousness (Conceptual dualism)
Pragmatism (Conceptual pragmatism)
 Paradigm (Conceptual scheme)
 Abstract and concrete (Conceptual object)
 Conceptual attrition, an idea of Beverley Skeggs
Conceptual proliferation
Conceptual history
Conceptual necessity

Linguistics and Semantics
Conceptual schema
Conceptual metaphor
Conceptual model
Conceptual blending
Conceptual semantics
Conceptual dictionary
Conceptual change
Conceptual dependency theory
Conceptual domain in Frame semantics (linguistics)
Inferential role semantics (Conceptual role semantics)

Psychology
Priming (psychology) (Conceptual priming)
Spatial–temporal reasoning (Visuo-conceptual)
Conceptual act model of emotion
Conceptual space

Science
Conceptual physics
Conceptual economy
Conceptual model (computer science)
Conceptual clustering
The Mythical Man-Month (Conceptual integrity)

Methodology and Data-modeling
Conceptual system
Conceptual framework
The Conceptual Framework
Entity–relationship model (Conceptual Entity Model)
Conceptual graph
CIDOC Conceptual Reference Model

Art and Music
Conceptual art
Conceptual design
Conceptual architecture
Conceptual photography
Post-conceptual
Neo-conceptual art
Progressive metal (Conceptual metal)
Progressive rock (Conceptual rock)
Concept album
NSCAD conceptual art
The View from this Tower (Conceptual Separation)
Conceptual Love

Law
 Conceptual separability in Copyright

See also
 Concept (disambiguation)